The GFA League First Division is the highest division of football in The Gambia. The league began play in 1965.

2021—22 season clubs

Previous champions

1965–66 : Augustinians (Bathurst)
1966–67 : Augustinians (Bathurst)
1967–68 : Adonis (Bathurst)
1968–69 : White Phantoms
1969–70 : Wallidan (Banjul)
1970–71 : Wallidan (Banjul)
1971–72 : Real de Banjul
1972–73 : Adonis (Bathurst)
1973–74 : Real de Banjul
1974–75 : Real de Banjul
1975–76 : Wallidan (Banjul)
1976–77 : Wallidan (Banjul)
1977–78 : Real de Banjul
1978–79 : Wallidan (Banjul)
1979–80 : Starlight Banjul
1980–81 : Wallidan (Banjul)
1981–82 : Wallidan (Banjul)
1982–83 : Real de Banjul
1983–84 : Gambia Ports Authority (Banjul)
1984–85 : Wallidan (Banjul)
1985–86 : Gambia Ports Authority (Banjul)
1986–87 : Augustinians (Bathurst)
1987–88 : Wallidan (Banjul)
1988–89 : not finished
1989–90 : not held
1990–91 : not completed
1991–92 : Wallidan (Banjul)
1992–93 : Hawks (Banjul)
1993–94 : Real de Banjul
1994–95 : Wallidan (Banjul)
1995–96 : Hawks (Banjul)
1996–97 : Real de Banjul
1997–98 : Real de Banjul
1998–99 : Gambia Ports Authority (Banjul)
1999–00 : Real de Banjul
2000–01 : Wallidan (Banjul)
2001–02 : Wallidan (Banjul)
2002–03 : Armed Forces (Banjul)
2003–04 : Wallidan (Banjul)
2005 : Wallidan (Banjul)
2006 : Gambia Ports Authority (Banjul)
2007 : Real de Banjul
2008 : Wallidan (Banjul)
2009 : Armed Forces (Banjul)
2010 : Gambia Ports Authority (Banjul)
2011 : Brikama United (Brikama)
2012 : Real de Banjul
2013 : Steve Biko (Bakau)
2014 : Real de Banjul
2014–15 : GAMTEL
2015–16 : Gambia Ports Authority (Banjul)
2016–17 : Armed Forces (Banjul)
2017–18 : GAMTEL (Banjul)
2018–19 : Brikama United (Brikama)
2019–20 : not completed
2020-21 : Fortune FC
2021-22 : Hawks (Banjul)

Performance By Club

Topscorers

References

External links
League at FIFA
RSSSF competition history

 
Football leagues in the Gambia
Gambia